Phoenix Marketcity may refer to:

 Phoenix Marketcity (Bangalore)
 Phoenix Marketcity (Chennai)
 Phoenix Marketcity (Mumbai)
 Phoenix Marketcity (Pune)